Achchuveli Central College (also known as Achchuveli Maha Vidyalayam) is a provincial school in Achchuveli, Sri Lanka.

See also
 List of schools in Northern Province, Sri Lanka

References

External links
 Achchuveli Central College

Provincial schools in Sri Lanka
Schools in Jaffna District

thirikaran sir to this school last principal .(2020)